Rufus Blaq is an American hip-hop artist who rose to fame with his single "Out of Sight (Yo)" which was featured on the Ride soundtrack.  Additionally, he is best known for creating songs with Salt-N-Pepa, Faith Evans, Destiny's Child, Marques Houston, Young Rome, Angie Stone and Omarion.

Studio albums and singles 
List of Studio albums as artist, with selected chart positions.

Featured artist 
List of singles as featured vocalist and/or artist.

Production and songwriting credits 
List of songs credited as a producer and/or songwriter, with chart positions.

References

External links 
 
 Rufus Blaq discography on AllMusic.com
 Rufus Blaq Chart History on Billboard.com
 Rufus Blaq discography on Discogs.com

Discographies of American artists